Brigadier General James Lochhead Jack DSO & Bar and Legion of Honour (1880–1962) was a British officer who fought during the First World War.  He became a war hero after coming back from the trenches, but his character was never the same again.  In 1964 his diaries were published (edited by John Terraine) and became a bestseller.

He was married to Jeanette Watson (1902–1996) and was survived by her and two sons, Kenneth and Angus.

References

External links 
Centre for First World War Studies: James Lochhead Jack
 Legion of Honour
 http://www.kibworth.org/General%20Jack.pdf

1880 births
1962 deaths
Cameronians officers
Argyll and Sutherland Highlanders officers
British Army generals of World War I
British Army personnel of the Second Boer War
Companions of the Distinguished Service Order
British Army brigadiers